Former monarchies include:

(Note: entries in bold refer to groups of kingdoms)

Ancient Near East
Early Bronze Age
 Ancient Egypt (3150 BC – 30 BC)
 Kingdom of Kish (c. 2900 BC – 2296 BC)
 Van Lang (2879 BC – 258 BC)
 Minoan (c. 2700 BC – c. 1600 BC)
 Kingdom of Uruk (c. 2600 BC – 2048 BC)
 Land of Punt (c. 2500 BC - 980 BC)
 Kingdom of Ur (c. 2500 BC – 1940 BC)
 Kingdom of Lagash (c. 2500 BC – 2046 BC)
 Kingdom of Kerma (2500 BC – 1500 BC)

Middle Bronze Age
 Amorite Kingdom (c. 2000 BC – 1595 BC)
 Kingdom of Assyria (c. 2000 BC – 605 BC)
 Kingdom of Larsa (1961 BC – 1674 BC)
 Babylonia (1830 BC – 732 BC) 
 Mycenaean (c. 1900 BC – c. 1100 BC)

East Asian Bronze Age
 Gojoseon Kingdom (2333 BC – 108 BC)
 Xia Kingdom (2070 BC – 1600 BC)
 Shang Kingdom (c. 1600 – 1046 BC)

Late Bronze Age
 Mitanni Kingdom (c. 1500 BC – c. 1300 BC)
 Kingdom of Arzawa (c. 1500 BC – c. 1200 BC)
 Phoenicia (1200 BC – 539 BC)

Iron Age
 Magadha Kingdom (  – 320 BC)
 Colchis ( – 164 BC)
 Kingdom of Phrygia (  – 696 BC)
 Kingdom of Lydia (  – 546 BC)
 Philistia (  – 732 BC)
 Sabaean Kingdom (c. 1100 BC – 275 AD)
 Zhou Kingdom (c. 1046 – 256 BC)
 United Kingdom of Israel and Judah – (1030 BC – 931 BC)
 Kingdom of Ammon (c. 1000 BC – 332 BC)
 Kingdom of Israel (930 BC – 720 BC)
 Kingdom of Judah (930 BC – 586 BC)
 Kingdom of Edom (c. 900 BC – c. 600 BC)
 Kingdom of Urartu (858 BC – 585 BC)

Antiquity

Asia
 Orintid Armenian Kingdom (c. 600 BC – 335 BC)
 Bosporan Kingdom (c. 600 BC – 443 AD)
 Pandyan Kingdom (c. 600 BC – 1345 AD)
 Scythia (c. 600 BC – c. 100 BC)
 Kingdom of Tambapanni (543 BC – 505 BC)
 Kingdom of Upatissa Nuwara (505 BC – 377 BC)
 Odrysian Kingdom (460 BC – 46 AD)
 Kingdom of Rajarata (377 BC – 1310 AD) (capitals: Anuradhapura, Sigiriya, Polonnaruwa)
 Kingdom of Armenia (331 BC – 428 AD)
 Kingdom of Iberia (302 BC – 580 AD)
 Dian Kingdom (c. 300 BC – 109 BC)
 Kingdom of Pontus (291 BC – 62 AD)
 Kingdom of Pergamon (282 BC – 133 BC)
 Kingdom of Au Lac (258 BC – 207 BC)
 Greco-Bactrian Kingdom (256 BC – 125 BC)
 Kingdom of Nanyue (204 BC – 111 BC)
 Kingdom of Sophene (c. 200 BC – 94 BC)
 Twipra Kingdom (c. 200 BC – 1858 AD)
 Indo-Scythian Kingdom (200 BC – 395 AD)
 Indo-Greek Kingdom (180 BC – 10 AD)
 Nabataean Kingdom (168 BC – 106 AD)
 Kingdom of Commagene (163 BC – 72 AD)
 Hasmonean Kingdom (140 BC – 37 BC)
 Kingdom of Lazica (131 BC – 697 AD)
 Himyarite Kingdom (110 BC – 525 AD)
 Buyeo Kingdom (c. 100 BC – 494 AD)
 Kuninda Kingdom (c. 100 BC – c. 200 AD)
 Silla Kingdom (57 BC – 935 AD)
 Goguryeo Kingdom (37 BC – 668 AD)
 Baekje Kingdom (18 BC – 660 AD)
 Indo-Parthian Kingdom (12 BC – 130 AD)
 Kingdom of Khotan (56 – 1006)
 Kingdom of Funan (c. 1 – 628)
 Langkasuka Kingdom (c. 100 – 1516)
 Tuyuhun Kingdom (285 – 670)
 Sixteen Kingdoms (304 – 439)
 Taruma Kingdom (358 – 669)
 Kamarupa (4th Century – 12th Century)
 Melayu Kingdom (4th Century – 13th Century)
 Deira (6th Century AD)
Europe
 Athens (  – 338 BC)
 Sparta (c. 900 BC – 146 BC)
 Macedonian Kingdom (808 BC – 146 BC)
 Roman Kingdom (c. 750 BC – c. 510 BC)
 Ancient Corinth (747 BC – 146 BC)
 Ancient Thebes (c. 500 BC – 335 BC)
 Kingdom of Mide (76 – 1171)
 Kingdom of Dacia (82 BC – 106 AD)
Africa
 Kingdom of Kush (1070 BC – 350 AD)
 Nok culture (1000 BC – 300 AD)
 Kingdom of D'mt (c. 700 BC – c. 400 BC)
 Ancient Carthage (650 BC – 146 BC)
 Ptolemaic Kingdom (305 BC – 30 BC)
 Kingdom of Numidia (202 BC – 46 BC)
 Kingdom of Aksum (100 AD – 940 AD)

Middle Ages
Asia 
 Kedah Kingdom (630 – 1136)
 Kingdom of Ternate (1257–1914)
 Kingdom of Sunda (669 – 1579)
 Kingdom of Champa (7th Century – 1832)
 Mataram Kingdom (752 – 1045)
 Kingdom of Abkhazia (778 – 1008)
 Pagan Kingdom (849 – 1287)
 Kingdom of the Kartvels (888 – 1008)
 Mon Kingdoms (9th – 11th, 13th – 16th, 18th centuries)
 Kingdom of Tondo (900s – 1589)
 Hubaekje (900 – 936)
 Hugoguryeo (c. 901 – 918)
 Bali Kingdom (914 – 1908)
 Dongdan Kingdom (926 – 936)
 Kingdom of Georgia (978 – 1223)
 Kingdom of Lori (979 – 1118)
 Kingdom of Butuan (possibly 1000 – 1600)
 Kingdom of Kakheti-Hereti (1020s – 1104)
 Kediri (1045 – 1221)
 Armenian Kingdom of Cilicia (1080 – 1375)
 Kingdom of Jerusalem (1099 – 1291)
 Chutiya Kingdom (1187 – 1673)
 Jaffna Kingdom (1215 – 1619)
 Singhasari Kingdom (1222 – 1292)
 Ahom kingdom (1228 – 1826)
 Kingdom of Lan Xang (1353 – 1707)
 Sukhothai Kingdom (1238 – 1438)
 Majapahit Kingdom (1293 – 1527)
 Ottoman Empire (1299 – 1923)
 Kingdom of Singapura (1299 – 1398)
 Ayutthaya Kingdom (1351 – 1767)
 Joseon Kingdom (1392 – 1897)
 Kingdom of Mysore (1399 – 1947)
 Garhwal Kingdom (c. 1400 – 1814)
 Malacca Sultanate (1400 – 1511)
 Kotte Kingdom (1412 – 1597)
 Ryūkyū Kingdom (1429 – 1879)
 Kingdom of Imereti (1455 – 1810)
 Kingdom of Kakheti (1465 – 1762)
 Kingdom of Kartli (1466 – 1762)
 Taungoo dynasty (1510 – 1752)
 Le dynasty (1428 – 1789)
 Kingdom of Lan Na (1292 – 1775)
Europe

 Frankish Kingdom (3rd Century – 10th Century)
 First Kingdom of Burgundy (4th Century)
 Kingdom of Galicia (Suebic Kingdom of Galicia) (410 – 584, 910 – 1833)
 Visigothic Kingdom (418 – 721)
 Kingdom of Kent (450 – 871)
 Kingdom of Gwynedd (460 – 1282)
 Kingdom of Sussex (477 – 825)
 Ostrogothic Kingdom (493 – 553)
 Kingdom of Ceredigion (5th Century – early 10th Century)
 Kingdom of Powys (5th Century – 1160)
 Kingdom of Wessex (519 – 927)
 Kingdom of Essex (527 – 812)
 Kingdom of Mercia (527 – 919)
 Kingdom of Bernicia (6th Century)
 Kingdom of the East Angles (6th Century – 917)
 Northumbria (654 – 878)
 Kingdom of Asturias (718 – 925)
 Kingdom of Navarre (824 – 1620)
 West Frankish Kingdom (843 – 987)
 Kingdom of Scotland (843 – 1707, 1660 – 1707)
 Bagratuni Kingdom of Armenia (845 – 1045)
 Kingdom of Castile (850 – 1230)
 Kingdom of Jórvík (876 – 954)
 Kingdom of Provence (879 – 933)
 Kingdom of Alba (900 – 1286)
 Kingdom of León (910 – 1230)
 Kingdom of Croatia (c. 925 – 1102, 1527 – 1868)
 Kingdom of England (927 – 1649, 1660 – 1707)
 Kingdom of Burgundy-Arles (933 – late Middle Ages)
 Kingdom of Deheubarth (950 – 1197)
 Kingdom of Viguera (970 – 1005)
 Kingdom of Hungary in the Middle Ages (1000 – 1570)
 Kingdom of Mann and the Isles (1079 – 1266)
 Kingdom of Poland (1025 – 1385, 1385 – 1569)
 Kingdom of Aragon (1035 – 1707)
 Kingdom of Duklja (1053 – 1100)
 Kingdom of Cyprus (1192 – 1489)
 Kingdom of Sicily (1130 – 1816)
 Kingdom of Portugal (1139 – 1910)
 Kingdom of Galicia–Volhynia (Rus) (1199 – 1349)
 Kingdom of Thessalonica (1204 – 1224)
 Kingdom of Bohemia (1212 – 1918)
 Kingdom of Serbia (medieval) (1217 – 1346)
 Kingdom of Valencia (1237 – 1707)
 Kingdom of Lithuania (1251 – 1263, 1918)
 Kingdom of Majorca (1262 – 1349)
 Kingdom of Albania (1272 – 1368)
 Kingdom of Naples (1285 – 1816)
 Kingdom of Bosnia (1377 – 1463)
 Kingdom of Poland (1025 – 1385, 1385 – 1569)

Africa
 Kingdom of Makuria (350 AD – 1276, 1286 – 1317)
 Kanem Empire (c. 700 AD – 1376)
 Kingdom of Nekor (710 AD – 1019)
 Ghana Empire (c. 750 AD – c. 1235)
 Kingdom of Nri (1043 – 1911)
 Kingdom of Sine (1100 – 1969)
 Almohad Caliphate (1121 – 1269)
 Ethiopian Empire (1137 – 1936)
 Ayyubid Sultanate (1171 – 1341)
 Mali Empire (c. 1230 – c. 1600)
 Mamluk Sultanate (1250 – 1517)
 Mankessim Kingdom (1252 – 1873)
 Ifat Sultanate (1285 – 1415)
 Warsangali Sultanate (1218–1886)
 Ajuran Sultanate (13th Century – 17th Century)
 Songhai Empire (c. 1340 – 1591)
 Jolof Empire (c. 1350 – 1549)
 Bornu Empire (c. 1380 – 1893)
 Kingdom of Kongo (c. 1390 – 1914)
 Kingdom of Kaffa (c. 1390 – 1897)
 Adal Sultanate (c. 1415 – 1559)
 Benin empire (c. 1440 – 1897)
 Kingdom of Mutapa (c. 1450 – 1698)
 Kingdom of Fez (1472 – 1554)
 Kingdom of Loango (15th Century – 19th Century)

Pre-Columbian Americas 
 Kingdom of Chimor (Chimu) (900 – 1470)
 K'iche' Kingdom of Q'umarkaj (13th Century – 1524)
 Kingdom of Tlaxcallan

Early Modern

Asia
 Kingdom of Sitawaka (1521 – 1594)
 Johor Sultanate (1528 – 1855)
 Kingdom of Middag (17th Century)
 Kingdom of Kandy (1581 – 1815)
 Kingdom of Tungning (1662 – 1683)
 Kingdom of Nepal (1768 – 2008)
 Kingdom of Maynila (1500s – 1571)
 Kingdom of Kartli-Kakheti (1762 – 1800)
 Thonburi Kingdom (1767 – 1782)
 Kingdom of Luang Phrabang (1707 – 1947)
 Kingdom of Vientiane (1707 – 1828)
 Kingdom of Champasak (1707 – 1904)
Europe

 Eastern Hungarian Kingdom (1526 – 1571)
 Kingdom of Croatia (c. 925 – 1102, 1527 – 1868)
 Royal Hungary (1570 – 1867)
 Kingdom of England (927 – 1707, 1660 – 1707)
 Kingdom of Ireland (1541 – 1651, 1659 – 1801)
 Kingdom of Livonia (1570 – 1578)
 Kingdom of Ireland (1541 – 1651, 1659 – 1801)
 Kingdom of Scotland (843 – 1707, 1660 – 1707)
 Kingdom of Prussia (1701 – 1918)
 Kingdom of Great Britain (1707 – 1801)
 Kingdom of Sardinia (1720 – 1861)
Africa
 Kasanze Kingdom (c. 1500 – 1648)
 Kingdom of Koya (1505 – 1896)
 Denanke Kingdom (1514 – 1776)
 Kingdom of Baguirmi (1522 – 1897)
 Kingdom of Matamba (1530 – 19th Century)
 Cayor Kingdom (1549 – 1879)
 Kingdom of Luba (1585 – 1889)
 Dendi Kingdom (1591 – 1901)
 Igala Kingdom (16th Century – 1901)
 Dahomey (c. 1600 – 1900)
 Kasanje Kingdom (1620 – 1910)
 Kuba Kingdom (1625 – 1900)
 Ouaddai Kingdom (1635 – 1912)
 Kénédougou Kingdom (c. 1650 – 1898)  
 Geledi Sultanate –  (c. late 17th Century – 1910)
 Ashanti Empire (c. 1701 – 1957)

Oceania
 Kingdom of Hawaii (1795 – 1893)
 Kingdom of Uvea (Wallis island) (1767 –)

Americas
 New Kingdom of Granada (16th Century – 1739)

Modern
Europe

 United Kingdom of Great Britain and Ireland (1801 – 1922)
 Kingdom of Italy (1805 – 1814, 1861 – 1946)
 Kingdom of Bavaria (1806 – 1918)
 Kingdom of Saxony (1806 – 1918)
 Kingdom of Württemberg (1806 – 1918)
 Kingdom of Westphalia (1807 – 1813)
 Kingdom of Hanover (1814 – 1866)
 United Kingdom of Portugal, Brazil and the Algarves (1815 – 1822)
 Kingdom of the Two Sicilies (1816 – 1861)
 Kingdom of Greece (1832 – 1924, 1935 – 1974)
 Kingdom of Sicily (1130-1816)
 Kingdom of Romania (1881 – 1947)
 Kingdom of Serbia (1882 – 1918)
 Kingdom of Bulgaria (1908 – 1946)
 Kingdom of Montenegro (1910 – 1918)
 Kingdom of Lithuania (1251 – 1263, 1918)
 Kingdom of Yugoslavia (1918 – 1943)
 Kingdom of Iceland (1918 – 1944)
 Albanian Kingdom (1928 – 1939)
 Modern Kingdom of Hungary (1920 – 1946)
 Kingdom of France (972 – 1792, 1814 – 1848)
 Russian Empire (1721 – 1917)
 German Empire (1871 – 1918)
 Austria-Hungary (1867 – 1918)
 Kingdom of Portugal (1139 – 1910)

Asia
 Imperial State of Iran (1925 – 1979)
 Kingdom of Hejaz (1916 – 1925)
 Arab Kingdom of Syria (1920)
 Kingdom of Kurdistan (1922 – 1924)
 Kingdom of Afghanistan (1926 – 1973)
 Kingdom of Hejaz and Nejd (1926 – 1932)
 Kingdom of Iraq (1932 – 1958)
 Kingdom of Yemen (1918 – 1962)
 Tibet (1912 – 1951)
 Empire of Japan (1868 – 1947)
 Korean Empire (1897 – 1910)
 Kingdom of Laos (1953 – 1975)
 Kingdom of Sikkim (1642 – 1975)
 Kingdom of Nepal (1768 – 2008)
 Konbaung dynasty (1752 – 1885)
 Nguyen dynasty (1802 – 1945)
 Tay Son dynasty (1778 – 1802)

Africa
 Zulu Kingdom (1816 – 1897)
 Yeke Kingdom (c. 1856 – 1891)
 Kingdom of Egypt (1922 – 1953)
 Kingdom of Libya (1951 – 1969)
 Kingdom of Tunisia (1956 – 1957)
 Kingdom of Burundi (1962 – 1966)
 Empire of Ethiopia (1270 – 1974)
 Sultanate of Zanzibar (1856 – 1964)
 Central African Empire (1976 – 1979)

The Americas
 First Empire of Haiti (1804 – 1806)
 Kingdom of Haiti (1811 – 1820)
 United Kingdom of Portugal, Brazil and the Algarves (1815 – 1822)
 First Mexican Empire (1821 – 1823)
 Empire of Brazil (1822 – 1889)
 Second Empire of Haiti (1849 – 1859)
 Second Mexican Empire (1863 – 1867)

See also
 List of current monarchies
 List of monarchies
 Abolition of monarchy
 List of empires
 List of medieval great powers
 List of largest empires

Monarchies, former
former